Frederick Robert Cooke (5 July 1896 – 1976) was an English professional footballer who played as a forward for Sunderland.

References

1896 births
1976 deaths
People from Kirkby-in-Ashfield
Footballers from Nottinghamshire
English footballers
Association football forwards
Sunderland A.F.C. players
Swindon Town F.C. players
Accrington Stanley F.C. players
Bangor City F.C. players
English Football League players